Sociology of Community is a book written by Maximilian Weber, a German economist and sociologist. The original edition was published in German, but various translations into English exist. The text covers Weber's views on economy, community, ethnicity and nationalism.

See also

 Sociology 
 Community

External links
Online ebook of Sociology of Community

Sociology books
Works by Max Weber